The Chairman of the Supreme Soviet of the Estonian Soviet Socialist Republic was the presiding officer of that assembly. It is not to be confused with the Chairman of the Presidium of the Supreme Soviet of the Estonian Soviet Socialist Republic; he was the head of state.

Below is a list of the office-holders:

See also
Riigikogu

Footnotes

Sources
"Elected representatives and state leaders". Members of Estonia's parliamentary and other assemblies as well as governments 1917–1999. Compiled by Jaan Toomla, Tallinn 1999
Liisa Maadla. Archivist. National Archives of Estonia

Political history of Estonia
Estonian Soviet Socialist Republic, Supreme Soviet, chairmen
Estonian SSR
List